Athletics at the 2024 Summer Olympics in Paris are scheduled to run over a ten-day period at four different venues (Pont d'Iéna for race walking, Hôtel de Ville and Les Invalides for the start and end points of the marathon races, and Stade de France for the track and field events) from 1 to 11 August 2024, featuring a total of 48 medal events across three distinct sets: track and field, road running, and racewalking. 

For the first time in history of athletics in the Olympics, men and women would have the same number of events. The mixed team race walking through a 35-kilometre course will contest for the first time at these Games, replacing the men's 50-kilometre race walk in the quest for gender equality. 

Another significant change to the athletics program is the repechage-round format in all individual track events from 200 to 1500 m and the hurdles events (110 m for men, 100 m for women, and 400 m for both), a vast opportunity for the runners to have a second chance of entering the semifinal phase. This format will replace the former system of athletes advancing through the fastest overall times (q) apart from those qualifying directly in the first-round heats (Q).

Venues
Track and field events will be staged at the iconic Stade de France, with the race walks contested at Pont d'Iena. The marathon races begin at the Hôtel de Ville (city hall) and will end in Les Invalides, witnessing the runners traverse many of the city's most iconic sites and Olympic venues throughout the route.

This traditional marathon course also sets a particularly tough profile with an overall elevation gain or loss of 438 m. The route, specially designed for the Paris 2024 Games and approved by World Athletics, is unique, demanding, and technical. Paris 2024 unveils the routes for the Olympic marathon and the two races – a 42.195 km course and a 10 km course – open to the general public as part of the mass event running.

Participating nations

Schedule 
Road events (marathons and racewalks) will hold the races in the morning session of the athletics program schedule, with all track, field, and combined events staging their finals in the evening session for the first time since London 2012.

In its four-decade-long Olympic history, the women's marathon will occur on the last day of the athletics program for the first time, with the men's race scheduled a day before. According to Tony Estanguet, a triple Olympic slalom canoeing champion and the president of Paris 2024 organizing committee, "We wanted to reverse the order in an ambition to more gender equality and bring women to the fore for the first time so the women's marathon will enjoy major visibility on 11 August to cap off the athletics program."

Qualification

Athletics – individual events
At the end of the 2022 season, World Athletics establishes a qualification system for athletics competition at the 2024 Summer Olympics. Similar to the previous edition, the qualification system is set on a dual pathway, where the initial half of the total quota (about fifty percent) will be distributed to the athletes through entry standards approved by the World Athletics council, with the remainder relying on the world ranking list within the qualifying period. Each country can enter a maximum of three athletes for each individual event on the Paris 2024 athletics program. The qualification period for all track and field events (except the 10,000 metres, heptathlon, and decathlon) runs from July 1, 2023, to June 30, 2024.

Athletics – relay teams
Each relay event features sixteen teams from their respective NOCs, composed of the following:
 14: top fourteen teams based on their results achieved at the 2024 World Athletics Relays in Nassau, Bahamas
 2: top two teams outside the key qualifier according to the World Athletics performance list for relays within the qualification period (December 31, 2022, to June 30, 2024)

Athletics – race walking mixed teams
The mixed team race walking event, covering a distance of 35 kilometres, features twenty-five pairs from their respective NOCs, composed of the following:
 16: top sixteen teams based on their results achieved at the 2024 World Athletics Race Walking Team Championships
 9: top nine teams outside the key qualifier through the World Athletics Race Walk rankings based on the aggregate scores of both a male and a female athlete within the qualification period (December 31, 2022, to June 30, 2024)

Athletics – 10,000 metres, road, and combined events
The qualification period for the 10,000 metres, combined events (men's decathlon and women's heptathlon), and racewalking will run from December 31, 2022, to June 30, 2024, whereas the marathon sets an earlier qualifying window for Paris 2024, staging between November 1, 2022, and April 30, 2024.

In the marathon races, any runner ranked higher than the sixty-fifth-place athlete on the filtered Quota Place "Road to Paris" list on January 30, 2024, will be deemed eligible for immediate selection to his or her respective national team at the Games. Beyond the deadline, the remaining twenty percent of the total quota will be determined by the same dual pathway qualification criteria outlined above without displacing any qualified athletes on the set date.

Medal summary

Medal table

Men's events

* Indicates the athlete only competed in the preliminary heats and received medals.

Women's events

* Indicates the athlete only competed in the preliminary heats and received medals.

Mixed events

* Indicates the athlete only competed in the preliminary heats and received medals.

See also
Athletics at the 2022 Asian Games
Athletics at the 2022 Commonwealth Games
Athletics at the 2023 European Games
Athletics at the 2023 Pan American Games
Athletics at the 2024 Summer Paralympics

References

2024 Paris
Athletics
Olympic Games
2024
2024 Olympics